Brachyspira hyodysenteriae, formerly Serpulina hyodysenteriae and other binomial names, is a species of bacteria. It is the causative agent of swine dysentery.

References

Spirochaetes